Greg(ory) Jones may refer to:

Greg Jones (Australian footballer) (born 1970), Australian rules footballer for St Kilda and Swan Districts

 Gregory Jones (barrister) (fl. 1980s–2010s)
Greg Jones (basketball) (born 1961), basketball player
Gregory Jones (cricketer) (born 1956), New Zealand cricketer
Greg Jones (running back) (born 1948), former NFL running back
Greg Jones (fullback) (born 1981), NFL fullback
Greg Jones (linebacker, born 1974), former NFL linebacker
Greg Jones (linebacker, born 1988), NFL linebacker 
Greg Jones (pitcher) (born 1976), Major League Baseball pitcher
Greg Jones (shortstop) (born 1998), baseball shortstop
Greg Jones (skier) (born 1953), American former alpine skier
Greg Jones (tennis) (born 1989), Australian tennis player
Greg Jones (wrestler) (born 1982), American collegiate wrestler
L. Gregory Jones (born 1960), theologian
Gregory V. Jones (born 1959), Wine climatologist
Greg Jones (rugby union) (born 1996), Irish rugby player

See also
Gregory Malek-Jones (born 1990), American singer, dancer and actor